Parazosmotes is a genus of longhorn beetles of the subfamily Lamiinae, containing the following species:

 Parazosmotes deceptor Holzschuh, 2009
 Parazosmotes scincus (Pascoe, 1865)

References

Pteropliini